The AEG B.I was a German two-seat biplane unarmed reconnaissance aircraft produced in very small numbers in 1914. It formed the basis for the more successful B- and C-type aircraft from AEG.

Operators

Luftstreitkräfte

Specifications (AEG B.I)

See also

External links

AEG B.I at the Virtual Aviation Museum

B.I
Single-engined tractor aircraft
Biplanes
1910s German military reconnaissance aircraft
Aircraft first flown in 1914